Snook is an English surname. The surname is of Old English origin, and is a topographical name, denoting someone who lived on a projecting piece of land. The etymology of snook is the Old English pre-7th century word "snoc", the Middle English "snoc" and "snoke": a projecting piece or point of land; a promontory. The surname has its main concentration in the UK in the southern counties of primarily Wiltshire, also Hampshire, Somerset and Dorset.

Surname
 Frank Snook (born 1949), American Major League Baseball player
 Gary Snook (born 1947), Western Australian Legislative Assembly member
 George Snook (1842–1894), American, President of the Chico Board of Trustees, the governing body of Chico, California from 1885 to 1886 and from 1892 to 1894
 Hans Snook (born 1948), German-Canadian businessman
 Ian Snook (born 1950), New Zealand cricketer
 James H. Snook (1879–1930), American convicted murderer, Olympic medalist, and inventor of the snook hook
 Jeff Snook (born 1960), American sportswriter
 John B. Snook (1815–1901), American architect
 John S. Snook (1862–1952), U.S. Representative from Ohio
 Laine Snook (born 1968), English athlete
 Larry Snook (born 1941), U.S. Army officer and judge
 Neta Snook (1896–1991), American aviator
 Ronald Snook (born 1972), Australian rower
 Sarah Snook (born 1987), Australian actress
 Verity Snook-Larby (born 1970), English race walker

Surname variations
 Snoek (surname)

See also 
 Eric Snookes (born 1955), English footballer
 Graeme Snooks (born 1944), Australian systems theorist
 Robert Snooks (1761–1802), English highwayman
 Tom Snooks (1890–1958), Australian showman and developer
 Zoon Van Snook, Belgian-English composer

Given name, nickname, or stage name
 Snook (comedian), Canadian comedian
 Robert Bernard "Snooks" Dowd (1897–1962), American football and baseball player
 Snooks Eaglin (1936–2009), American musician

See also
 Snoek (surname)
 Snook (disambiguation)

References

English-language surnames